The 2023 Atlantic 10 men's basketball tournament is the postseason men's basketball tournament for the 2022–23 season of the Atlantic 10 Conference (A-10). It will be held from March 7–12, 2023, in Brooklyn, New York, at Barclays Center.

Seeds 
All 15 A-10 schools will participate in the tournament. Teams will be seeded by winning percentage within the conference, with a tiebreaker system to seed teams with identical percentages. The top 9 teams will receive a first-round bye, and the top 4 teams will receive a double-bye, automatically advancing them to the quarterfinals.

Schedule 

*Game times in Eastern Time.

Bracket

References 

Tournament
Atlantic 10 men's basketball tournament
Basketball competitions in New York City
Atlantic 10 men's basketball tournament
Atlantic 10 men's basketball tournament
College basketball tournaments in New York (state)